The Clarenville Caribous (also commonly known as the Clarenville Ford Caribous due to an ongoing sponsorship deal announced September 23, 2015) are a senior ice hockey team based in Clarenville, Newfoundland and Labrador and a member of the Central West Senior Hockey League. The Caribous are three-time winners of the Herder Memorial Trophy as all-Newfoundland and Labrador Senior Hockey Champions and winners of the 2011 Allan Cup as National Senior "AAA" Hockey Champions.

History

The Caribous broke into the WCSHL in 2006-2007, ending the season in last place with 18 points. However, in the very next season in 2007-2008 they shot past the other three teams, ending the season in first place with 30 points. They also went on to beat the Corner Brook Royals in the first round of the playoffs, only to be defeated by the Deer Lake Red Wings in the next. A very big improvement for one year.

The following season proved to be an even bigger improvement for the team. In the club's third year in the League, the 2008-2009 season, the team went to the playoffs to win against the Grand Falls-Windsor Cataracts, and got revenge on the Deer Lake Red Wings, defeating them in the next round. The Caribous went on to play the Conception Bay North CeeBee Stars in the final, and won the series 4-1. Clarenville won the Herder Memorial Trophy for the first time in club history.

In the Summer of 2009, the Caribous applied for Sr. AAA status to compete in future Allan Cup National Championship events.  After winning the 2010 WCSHL Championship, the Caribous took home their second straight Herder Memorial Trophy be beating CBN for the second year in a row, 4-1.  The Caribous were winless (0-3) at the 2010 Allan Cup in Fort St. John, British Columbia.

In 2010-11, the Caribous went 14-10-0-0 for second place in the WCSHL. They were eliminated in the league semi-final by Deer Lake to end their hopes for a third straight league title and Herder Trophy. Again registered with Hockey Canada as Senior AAA, the Caribous traveled west to Kenora, Ontario to compete at the 2011 Allan Cup.  The Caribous went undefeated (4-0), beating Alberta's Bentley Generals 5-3 in the final to win their first and Newfoundland and Labrador's second ever Allan Cup.

Seasons and Records

Season by season results

Note: GP = Games played, W = Wins, L = Losses, T = Ties, OTL = Overtime Losses, Pts = Points, GF = Goals for, GA = Goals against, DNQ = Did not qualifyWCSHL = West Coast Senior Hockey League, NSHL = Newfoundland Senior Hockey League, CWSHL = Central West Senior Hockey LeagueAllan Cup results

Current rosterFor the current team roster see Caribous profile on the league website''

Leaders

Captains
Dustin Russell (2006-2015)
Andrew Sweetland (2015-2016)

Coaches
Randy Pearcey (2006-2010)
Ivan Hapgood (2014-2016)
Rebecca Russell (2016-)

Trophies and awards

Team awards
Three all-Newfoundland senior hockey championships (Herder Memorial Trophy): 2009, 2010, 2012
Awarded the Allan Cup in 2011 as the national senior amateur men's ice hockey champions of Canada.

Individual awards

S. E Tuma Memorial Trophy (Top scorer in the regular season)
Andrew Sweetland, 2013 (42 pts)

T.A. (Gus) Soper Memorial Award (MVP in the regular season)

President's Goaltender's Award (Top goaltender in the regular season of operating Senior A leagues)

Top Defenseman

Rookie of the year

Coach of the Year

Howie Clouter Memorial Trophy (Most Gentlemanly and effective player)

Cliff Gorman Memorial Award (Most valuable player of the Herder Playoffs)

Honoured Members

Retired numbers
 #27 Les Stanley (1962-1980)
 #2 Bill Norcott (1963-1975)
 #7 Robert Gladney (1981-1983)

Clarenville Caribous Logo
 Caribous logo created by Newfoundland artist Reilly Fitzgerald and web developer Todd Cole (2006)

See also
List of ice hockey teams in Newfoundland and Labrador

References

External links 
 Clarenville Ford Caribous Facebook site
 Team profile

Ice hockey in Newfoundland and Labrador
Ice hockey teams in Newfoundland and Labrador
2006 establishments in Newfoundland and Labrador
Ice hockey clubs established in 2006